Viktoriia Diakova (born 29 September 1993 in Kyiv, Ukraine) is a Ukrainian athlete who competes in compound archery. She started archery and first competed for the Ukrainian national team in 2007. She is righthanded. Her draw weight is 55 lbs. As well as competing internationally in archery, she is a student. Her hobby is anime.

She is the member of the Ukrainian women's team that won the first ever medal in compound archery and the first ever gold medal overall for Ukraine at World Archery Championships in 2015.

References

Living people
Ukrainian female archers
1993 births
World Archery Championships medalists
Sportspeople from Kyiv
21st-century Ukrainian women